The Real California License is a 2011 re-release of California License and contains all known recordings from Jett Powers and Orville Woods aka P.J. Proby. Additionally, the CD contains two unreleased demos by Jett Powers that have never been released before. The liner text is written by Proby.

Track listing 
 "Go Girl Go"
 "Teenage Quarrel"
 "I Need Love"
 "You Got Me Crying"
 "Loud Perfume"
 "My Trouble"
 "Wicked Woman" (Orville Woods)
 "Darlin’" (Orville Woods)
 "Rockin’ Pneumonia"
 "Linda Lu"
 "Question"
 "Stagger Lee"
 "Zing! Went the Strings of My Heart"
 "Pretty Girls Everywhere"
 "Honey Hush"
 "Tomorrow Night"
 "Stranded in the Jungle"
 "Mia Amore"
 "Hound Dog"
 "Forever My Darling"
 "Daddy’s Home"
 "Bob Ting-a-Ling"
 "Blue Moon"
 "Caldonia"
 "Give Me Time" (Demo)
 "Just in Time" (Demo)

External links
 (The Real) California License)

2011 albums
P. J. Proby albums